Hydrazides in organic chemistry are a class of organic compounds with the formula RNHNH2 where R is acyl (R'CO-), sulfonyl (R'SO2-), or phosphoryl (R'2P(O)-).  Unlike hydrazine and alkylhydrazines, hydrazides are nonbasic owing to the inductive influence of the acyl, sulfonyl, or phosphoryl substituent.

Sulfonyl hydrazides

A common sulfonyl hydrazide is p-toluenesulfonyl hydrazide, a white air-stable solid. They are also widely used as organic reagents.

Toluenesulfonyl hydrazide is used to generate toluenesulfonyl hydrazones.  When derived from ketones, these hydrazones participate in the Shapiro reaction and the Eschenmoser–Tanabe fragmentation. 

2,4,6-Triisopropylbenzenesulfonylhydrazide is a useful source of diimide.

Acyl hydrazide

Acylhydrazines are derivatives of carboxylic acids, although they are typically prepared by the reaction of esters with hydrazine:

Use
An applied example is a synthesis of sunitinib begins by mixing 5-fluoroisatin slowly into hydrazine hydrate.  After 4 hours at 110 °C, the indole ring structure has been broken into (2-amino-5-fluoro-phenyl)-acetic acid hydrazide with reduction of the ketone at the 3-position.  Subsequent annelation in strong acid creates the 1,3-dihydro-2-oxo indole structure required for the drug.

Uses 

1.) Hydrazide analogs has biological activities like antidepressant, anticonvulsant, antiinflammatory, antibacterial, antimalarial, anticancer, and antimicrobial.

2.) Hydrazide is a drug used as a tablet. It is typically used for the treatment of edema, high blood pressure or hypertension.

See also
hydrazide imide - tautomeric form of amidrazone

References 

Functional groups